Arthur Duff (1899–1956) was an Irish composer and conductor.

Arthur Duff may also refer to:

Arthur Duff (cricketer) (born 1883, death unknown), Jamaican cricketer
Arthur Duff (MP) (1743–1805), Scottish MP for Elginshire
Arthur Grant Duff (1861–1948), British diplomat
Arthur Antony Duff (1920–2000), British diplomat and Director General of MI5